The 1989 Wichita State Shockers baseball team represented Wichita State University in the 1989 NCAA Division I baseball season. The Shockers played their home games at Eck Stadium. The team was coached by Gene Stephenson in his 12th season at Wichita State.

The Shockers won the College World Series, defeating the Texas Longhorns in the championship game.

Roster

Schedule 

! style="background:#F9D616;color:black;"| Regular Season
|- valign="top" 

|- align="center" bgcolor="#ffdddd"
| February 19 || Arkansas || 1-5 || 0-1 || –
|- align="center" bgcolor="#ddffdd"
| February 25 ||  || 9-0 || 1-1 || –
|- align="center" bgcolor="#ddffdd"
| February 25 || Kearney State || 10-2 || 2-1 || –
|- align="center" bgcolor="#ddffdd"
| February 26 || Kearney State || 17-0 || 3-1 || –
|-

|- align="center" bgcolor="#ddffdd"
| March 3 ||  || 16-2 || 4-1 || –
|- align="center" bgcolor="#ddffdd"
| March 8 ||  || 11-10 || 5-1 || –
|- align="center" bgcolor="#ddffdd"
| March 8 || Fort Hays State || 11-0 || 6-1 || –
|- align="center" bgcolor="#ddffdd"
| March 9 ||  || 16-5 || 7-1 || –
|- align="center" bgcolor="#ddffdd"
| March 9 || Loyola Marymount || 28-0 || 8-1 || –
|- align="center" bgcolor="#ddffdd"
| March 11 || at  || 21-3 || 9-1 || –
|- align="center" bgcolor="#ddffdd"
| March 12 || at Oral Roberts || 11-2 || 10-1 || –
|- align="center" bgcolor="#ddffdd"
| March 13 || at  || 9-3 || 11-1 || –
|- align="center" bgcolor="#ddffdd"
| March 14 || at New Mexico || 21-4 || 12-1 || –
|- align="center" bgcolor="#ddffdd"
| March 15 || vs.  || 7-4 || 13-1 || –
|- align="center" bgcolor="#ddffdd"
| March 15 || at New Mexico || 20-2 || 14-1 || –
|- align="center" bgcolor="#ddffdd"
| March 16 || vs. Colorado State || 23-3 || 15-1 || –
|- align="center" bgcolor="#ddffdd"
| March 16 || at New Mexico || 28-2 || 16-1 || –
|- align="center" bgcolor="#ddffdd"
| March 18 ||  || 8-4 || 17-1 || –
|- align="center" bgcolor="#ddffdd"
| March 19 ||  || 13-2 || 18-1 || –
|- align="center" bgcolor="#ddffdd"
| March 20 || Georgia Tech || 7-2 || 19-1 || –
|- align="center" bgcolor="#ddffdd"
| March 21 || Texas Tech || 16-4 || 20-1 || –
|- align="center" bgcolor="#ddffdd"
| March 21 || Texas Tech || 8-2 || 21-1 || –
|- align="center" bgcolor="#ddffdd"
| March 23 ||  || 29-6 || 22-1 || –
|- align="center" bgcolor="#ddffdd"
| March 25 || vs.  || 10-1 || 23-1 || –
|- align="center" bgcolor="#ddffdd"
| March 26 || vs.  || 8-4 || 24-1 || –
|- align="center" bgcolor="#ffdddd"
| March 26 || at  || 2-7 || 24-2 || –
|- align="center" bgcolor="#ddffdd"
| March 27 || vs.  || 6-1 || 25-2 || –
|- align="center" bgcolor="#ddffdd"
| March 28 || vs.  || 11-1 || 26-2 || –
|- align="center" bgcolor="#ddffdd"
| March 29 || vs. Hawaii-Hilo || 5-3 || 27-2 || –
|- align="center" bgcolor="#ddffdd"
| March 29 || at Hawaii || 4-3 || 28-2 || –
|- align="center" bgcolor="#ddffdd"
| March 30 || vs. Portland State || 6-0 || 29-2 || –
|- align="center" bgcolor="#ffdddd"
| March 31 || vs. Lewis & Clark || 2-4 || 29-3 || –
|-

|- align="center" bgcolor="#ddffdd"
| April 1 || vs. Fordham || 8-4 || 30-3 || –
|- align="center" bgcolor="#ddffdd"
| April 4 || Oral Roberts || 4-1 || 31-3 || –
|- align="center" bgcolor="#ddffdd"
| April 5 || Oral Roberts || 10-9 || 32-3 || –
|- align="center" bgcolor="#ddffdd"
| April 8 ||  || 13-3 || 33-3 || 1-0
|- align="center" bgcolor="#ffdddd"
| April 8 || Indiana State || 1-3 || 33-4 || 1-1
|- align="center" bgcolor="#ffdddd"
| April 9 || Indiana State || 4-11 || 33-5 || 1-2
|- align="center" bgcolor="#ddffdd"
| April 10 || Indiana State || 7-1 || 34-5 || 2-2
|- align="center" bgcolor="#ddffdd"
| April 11 ||  || 28-0 || 35-5 || –
|- align="center" bgcolor="#ddffdd"
| April 12 ||  || 3-0 || 36-5 || –
|- align="center" bgcolor="#ddffdd"
| April 15 ||  || 8-7 || 37-5 || 3-2
|- align="center" bgcolor="#ffdddd"
| April 15 || Illinois State || 4-5 || 37-6 || 3-3
|- align="center" bgcolor="#ddffdd"
| April 16 || Illinois State || 26-3 || 38-6 || 4-3
|- align="center" bgcolor="#ffdddd"
| April 16 || Illinois State || 4-6 || 38-7 || 4-4
|- align="center" bgcolor="#ffdddd"
| April 19 ||  || 6-11 || 38-8 || –
|- align="center" bgcolor="#ddffdd"
| April 20 || at  || 9-2 || 39-8 || –
|- align="center" bgcolor="#ddffdd"
| April 22 || at  || 14-3 || 40-8 || 5-4
|- align="center" bgcolor="#ddffdd"
| April 23 || at Bradley || 4-0 || 41-8 || 6-4
|- align="center" bgcolor="#ddffdd"
| April 25 ||  || 17-5 || 42-8 || –
|- align="center" bgcolor="#ddffdd"
| April 26 || at Oklahoma State || 12-4 || 43-8 || –
|- align="center" bgcolor="#ddffdd"
| April 27 || Kansas || 14-0 || 44-8 || –
|- align="center" bgcolor="#ddffdd"
| April 29 || at  || 12-4 || 45-8 || 7-4
|- align="center" bgcolor="#ffdddd"
| April 29 || at Southern Illinois || 1-4 || 45-9 || 7-5
|- align="center" bgcolor="#ddffdd"
| April 30 || at Southern Illinois || 5-2 || 46-9 || 8-5
|- align="center" bgcolor="#ddffdd"
| April 30 || at Southern Illinois || 6-4 || 47-9 || 9-5
|-

|- align="center" bgcolor="#ddffdd"
| May 2 || at Nebraska || 15-3 || 48-9 || –
|- align="center" bgcolor="#ddffdd"
| May 3 || at Kansas || 7-2 || 49-9 || –
|- align="center" bgcolor="#ffdddd"
| May 4 || Kansas || 6-9 || 49-10 || –
|- align="center" bgcolor="#ddffdd"
| May 6 ||  || 11-1 || 50-10 || 10-5
|- align="center" bgcolor="#ddffdd"
| May 6 || Creighton || 9-2 || 51-10 || 11-5
|- align="center" bgcolor="#ddffdd"
| May 7 || Creighton || 18-3 || 52-10 || 12-5
|- align="center" bgcolor="#ddffdd"
| May 7 || Creighton || 4-3 || 53-10 || 13-5
|- align="center" bgcolor="#ddffdd"
| May 10 ||  || 12-2 || 54-10 || –
|- align="center" bgcolor="#ddffdd"
| May 11 ||  || 8-6 || 55-10 || –
|- align="center" bgcolor="#ddffdd"
| May 12 || BYU || 16-15 || 56-10 || –
|- align="center" bgcolor="#ffdddd"
| May 12 || BYU || 3-9 || 56-11 || –
|- align="center" bgcolor="#ffdddd"
| May 13 || BYU || 3-9 || 56-12 || –
|-

|-
! style="background:#F9D616;color:black;"| Post-Season
|-

|- align="center" bgcolor="#ddffdd"
| May 19 || vs. Southern Illinois || 16-3 || 57-12
|- align="center" bgcolor="#ffdddd"
| May 19 || vs. Indiana State || 1-4 || 57-13
|- align="center" bgcolor="#ddffdd"
| May 20 || vs. Southern Illinois || 5-3 || 58-13
|- align="center" bgcolor="#ffdddd"
| May 20 || vs. Indiana State || 7-12 || 58-14
|-

|- align="center" bgcolor="#ddffdd"
| May 26 || vs.  || 4-0 || 59-14
|- align="center" bgcolor="#ddffdd"
| May 27 || vs.  || 12-1 || 60-14
|- align="center" bgcolor="#ffdddd"
| May 28 || vs.  || 5-14 || 60-15
|- align="center" bgcolor="#ddffdd"
| May 28 || vs.  || 6-4 || 61-15
|- align="center" bgcolor="#ddffdd"
| May 29 || vs. Michigan || 3-2 || 62-15
|- align="center" bgcolor="#ddffdd"
| May 29 || vs. Michigan || 9-5 || 63-15
|-

|- align="center" bgcolor="ddffdd"
| June 2 || vs. Arkansas || Rosenblatt Stadium || 3-1 || 64-15
|- align="center" bgcolor="ffdddd"
| June 4 || vs. Florida State || Rosenblatt Stadium || 2-4 || 64-16
|- align="center" bgcolor="ddffdd"
| June 6 || vs. Arkansas || Rosenblatt Stadium || 8-4 || 65-16
|- align="center" bgcolor="ddffdd"
| June 7 || vs. Florida State || Rosenblatt Stadium || 7-4 || 66-16
|- align="center" bgcolor="ddffdd"
| June 9 || vs. Florida State || Rosenblatt Stadium || 7-4 || 67-16
|- align="center" bgcolor="ddffdd"
| June 10 || vs. Texas || Rosenblatt Stadium || 5-3 || 68-16
|-

Awards and honors 
Jim Audley
 College World Series All-Tournament Team
 All-MVC Second Team

Greg Brummett
 College World Series Most Outstanding Player
 All-America Second Team
 MVC Pitcher of the Year
 All-MVC First Team

Pat Cedeno
 All-MVC Second Team

Todd Dreifort
 College World Series All-Tournament Team

P.J. Forbes
 All-MVC Second Team

Mike Lansing
 All-America Second Team
 All-MVC First Team

Mike McDonald
 All-America Second Team
 All-MVC First Team

Pat Meares
 College World Series All-Tournament Team

Jim Newlin
 College World Series All-Tournament Team
 All-MVC Second Team

Darrin Paxton
 All-America Freshman Team

Eric Wedge
 College World Series All-Tournament Team
 All-America First Team
 MVC Player of the Year
 All-MVC First Team

Bryant Winslow
 All-MVC Second Team

Shockers in the 1989 MLB Draft 
The following members of the Wichita State Shockers baseball program were drafted in the 1989 Major League Baseball Draft.

References 

Wichita State
Wichita State Shockers baseball seasons
College World Series seasons
NCAA Division I Baseball Championship seasons
Missouri Valley Conference baseball champion seasons